One for One is the fifth studio album by Canadian country music artist Julian Austin. It was released by Little Ol' Records on May 26, 2009. "Fat Bottomed Girls," "She Knows About Cryin'," "If Houston Doesn't Want You" and "Goodbye Exit Sign" were released as singles.

Track listing

External links
[ One for One] at Allmusic

2009 albums
Julian Austin (musician) albums